Madame Tussauds New York (UK /təˈsɔːdz/, US /tuːˈsoʊz/; the family themselves pronounce it /ˈtuːsoʊ/) is a tourist attraction located on 42nd Street in the Times Square neighborhood of Midtown Manhattan in New York City. Madame Tussauds was founded by the wax sculptor, Marie Tussaud, and is now operated by the United Kingdom-based entertainment company, Merlin Entertainments. The Madame Tussauds New York location opened on November 15, 2000.

History

Background 
Marie Tussaud was born as Marie Grosholtz in 1761 in Strasbourg, France. Her mother worked as a housekeeper for Dr. Philippe Curtius in Bern, Switzerland, who was a physician skilled in wax modelling. Curtius taught Tussaud the art of wax modelling.

In 1777, Tussaud created her first wax sculpture of Voltaire and soon after began sculpting death masks of notable victims in the French Revolution. These masks were then held up as revolutionary flags and paraded through the streets of Paris. In 1794, Marie's mentor, Dr. Phillipe Curtius, died and Tussaud inherited his entire collection.

Marie married Francois Tussaud in 1795 and lent a new name to the show: Madame Tussaud's. By 1835 Marie had settled down in Baker Street, London, and opened a museum, Madame Tussaud's. This part of the exhibition included victims of the French Revolution and newly created figures of murderers and other criminals. Several famous people were added to the exhibition, including Lord Nelson, and Sir Walter Scott. Some of the sculptures done by Marie Tussaud herself still exist. The gallery originally contained some 400 different figures, but fire damage in 1925, coupled with German bombs in 1941, has rendered most of these older models defunct. The casts themselves have survived allowing the historical waxworks to be remade. These can be seen in the museum's history exhibit. The oldest figure on display is that of Madame du Barry, otherwise known as "sleeping beauty", and this figure is located at Madame Tussauds London. In 1842, Tussaud made a self-portrait which is now on display at several Madame Tussauds locations. On 15 April 1850, Madame Tussaud died in her sleep.

In 1883, the restricted space and rising cost of the Baker Street site prompted Marie Tussaud's grandson, Joseph Randall, to commission the building at its current location on Marylebone Road. The new exhibition galleries were opened on 14 July 1884 and were a great success. A limited company was formed in 1888 to attract fresh capital but had to be dissolved after disagreements between the family shareholders. In February 1889, The Tussaud's group was sold to a group of businessmen led by Edwin Josiah Poyse.

Current status 
Madame Tussauds museums are currently owned by Merlin Entertainments after the acquisition of The Tussauds Group in May 2007.

Notable figures 

A list of some of the notable figures:

See also 
Madame Tussauds Washington D.C.
Madame Tussauds Hollywood
Madame Tussauds Las Vegas

References

External links

New York City
Tourist attractions in Manhattan
2000 establishments in New York City
42nd Street (Manhattan)
Times Square